Mazara Nauabad or Mazara Nau Abad is a village in Shaheed Bhagat Singh Nagar district of Punjab State, India. The village is administrated by Sarpanch an elected representative of the village.

Demography 
As of 2011, Mazara Nauabad has a total number of 260 houses and population of 1182 of which 612 include are males while 570 are females according to the report published by Census India in 2011. The literacy rate of Mazara Nauabad is 83.07%, higher than the state average of 75.84%. The population of children under the age of 6 years is 119 which is 10.07% of total population of Mazara Nauabad, and child sex ratio is approximately 859 as compared to Punjab state average of 846.

Most of the people are from Schedule Caste which constitutes 47.21% of total population in Mazara Nauabad. The town does not have any Schedule Tribe population so far.

As per the report published by Census India in 2011, 378 people were engaged in work activities out of the total population of Mazara Nauabad which includes 337 males and 41 females. According to census survey report 2011, 91.01% workers describe their work as main work and 8.99% workers are involved in Marginal activity providing livelihood for less than 6 months.

Education 
The village has a Punjabi medium, co-ed alimentary  school. The schools provide mid-day meal as per Indian Midday Meal Scheme. The school provide free education to children between the ages of 6 and 14 as per Right of Children to Free and Compulsory Education Act. Amardeep Singh Shergill Memorial college Mukandpur and Sikh National College Banga are the nearest colleges.

Landmarks and history 

The village has a shrine Gurudwara Rasokhana Nabh Kanwal Raja Sahib which situated on Karnana-Gunachaur road. In 1940, Nabh Kanwal Raja Sahib who was an Indian spiritual master, regarded by his devotees as a saint, fakir and satguru died in this village and his body was cremated at the same place used to called Takht of Nabh Kanwal Raja Sahib and later it was converted into a tomb. Some of the good has been preserved which was used by Nabh Kanwal Raja Sahib. A religious fair held at the Gurdwara annually, which attended by people of all religions.

Transport 

See also 
List of villages in India

References

External links 
 Tourism of Punjab
 Census of Punjab
 Locality Based PINCode

Villages in Shaheed Bhagat Singh Nagar district